Laurel Kean (born June 14, 1963) is an American professional golfer who played on the LPGA Tour.

Kean was born in Portland, Maine. She played college golf at University of South Florida where she was an All-American in 1986.

Kean turned professional in 1987 and played on the Futures Tour. She won nine events in 1987, setting the single season record, and was named Player of the Year.

Kean had her lone LPGA Tour win  in 2000, the first by a Monday qualifier.

After retiring from active competition in 2006, Kean became a teaching pro at La Playa Golf Club in Naples, Florida.

Professional wins

LPGA Tour wins (1)

LPGA Tour playoff record (0–1)

Futures Tour wins (10)
1987 (9) Lake City Classic, Christa McAuliffe Classic, Fort Leavenworth Classic, Western Slope Ford Classic, Sierra Sage Classic, Quail Ranch Classic, Bacon Park Classic, Golf Hammock Classic, Marsh Landing Classic
1996 (1) Golden Flake/Golden Ocala Futures Classic

References

External links

American female golfers
LPGA Tour golfers
Golfers from Maine
University of South Florida alumni
Sportspeople from Portland, Maine
1963 births
Living people
21st-century American women